The Anglican Catholic Church (ACC), also known as the Anglican Catholic Church (Original Province), is a body of Christians in the continuing Anglican movement, which is separate from the Anglican Communion led by the Archbishop of Canterbury (and symbolically and ceremonially, by the British monarch, as Supreme Governor of the Church of England). This denomination is separate from the Anglican Catholic Church in Australia and the Anglican Catholic Church of Canada.

The continuing Anglican movement, including the Anglican Catholic Church, grew out of the 1977 Congress of St. Louis. The name "Anglican Catholic" is defined as "Anglican – simply means English" and "Catholic – in the ordinary sense means Universal" with the explanation that "The ACC affirms the Canon of St. Vincent of Lérins, who defined the Catholic Faith as, 'That which has been believed everywhere, always and by all' (i.e. universally within the undivided Christian Church)." Within historic Anglicanism the ACC sees itself as "rooted in a Catholic stream of faith and practice that embraces Henrician Catholicism, the theological method of Hooker and the Carolines, the piety and learning of Andrewes, the recovering liturgical practice of the Non-Jurors, the Oxford Movement, through the Ritualists, to modern Anglo-Catholicism."

History
The Congress of St. Louis was held in response to the Episcopal Church's revision of the Book of Common Prayer, which organizers felt abandoned a true commitment to both scripture and historical Anglicanism. The decision to allow the ordination of women was one part of a larger theological position opposed by the congress. As a result of the congress, various Anglicans separated from the Episcopal Church and formed the "Anglican Catholic Church" to continue the Anglican tradition as they understood it. Its adherents have therefore claimed that this church is the true heir of the Church of England in the United States.

The congress's statement of principles (the "Affirmation of St. Louis") summarized the new church's reason for being as follows:

In January 1978, four bishops (Charles Doren, James Orin Mote, Robert Morse, and Francis Watterson) were consecrated. What had provisionally been called the Anglican Church in North America (Episcopal), was renamed Anglican Catholic Church at the constitutional assembly in Denver, 18–21 October 1978. Questions over jurisdiction and authority caused the church to be eventually divided. The Canadian parishes formed the Anglican Catholic Church of Canada, and American parishes formed three separate bodies, the Anglican Catholic Church, the United Episcopal Church of North America and the Diocese of Christ the King. In 1983, a statement of unity led to the coalescence of the Anglican Catholic Church. In 1984 a portion of the Anglican Episcopal Church of North America merged with the ACC to become the non-geographical Diocese of St. Paul.

In 1991 a number of parishes left the Anglican Catholic Church to merge with the American Episcopal Church and form the Anglican Church in America. In 1997 additional parishes left and formed the Holy Catholic Church (Anglican Rite).

Since 1990 the Anglican Catholic Church has expanded to six continents and nearly two dozen countries, including the Americas, the United Kingdom, Australia, and Africa, so that today the Anglican Catholic Church has over 250 parish churches and missions worldwide, and at the end of 2015 the membership of the Original Province was counted as 30,711. Worldwide mission and development is done through the St. Paul Mission Society, which was founded to "provide funding, personnel, and other forms of support for domestic and international missions," and to assist in "the amelioration, relief, and assistance of persons and communities distressed by natural or man-made events or disasters or by adverse social or political situations." Based in the US, the main focus of the Society is in the developing world. In 1982 the ACC created the Missionary Diocese of the Caribbean and New Granada and consecrated Justo Pastor Ruiz its first bishop. At Provincial Synod, October 2007, Wilson Garang and his Diocese of Aweil in Sudan were received into the Anglican Catholic Church. In 2015, the number of ACC dioceses in South Africa grew to four. At the 24th Provincial Synod, in September 2021, a new province, the Province of South Africa, was canonically erected. 

In October 2005 Mark Haverland of Athens, Georgia, replaced John Vockler, who was in charge from 2001 to 2005, as archbishop and metropolitan.  In 2017 the ACC signed the Atlanta Concordat with the Anglican Church in America, the Anglican Province of America, and the Diocese of the Holy Cross forming the "G4." At the Provincial Synod in September 2021, the Diocese of the Holy Cross voted to join the ACC as a non-geographical diocese.

Ecumenical relations and relations with other Anglican jurisdictions

ACC-APCK-UECNA 
From 2005 to 2011, the ACC and the United Episcopal Church of North America (UECNA) explored opportunities for greater cooperation and the possibility of achieving organic unity. On May 17, 2007, Archbishop Haverland signed an inter-communion agreement negotiated with the United Episcopal Church of North America. In July, Archbishop Haverland published a statement on church unity, calling on UECNA and the Anglican Province of Christ the King (APCK) to join him in building "full organic unity." Bishop Presley Hutchens of the ACC addressed delegates to the UECNA convention of October 2008 and discussed the possibility of uniting the ACC and UECNA. Although well received at the time, there was a feeling among many of the delegates that the proposal was being rushed, and that no proper consideration was being given to the theological, constitutional and canonical issues thrown up by the move. In January 2009 one bishop from each jurisdiction consecrated three suffragan bishops in St. Louis, intending that they serve all three jurisdictions. Moves towards unity with the Anglican Catholic Church were referred for further discussion and subsequently stalled in 2011 by the decision of UECNA to remain an independent jurisdiction.

GAFCON and ACNA 
In 2008, Archbishop Mark Haverland published a response to the 2008 meeting of Global Anglican Future Conference (GAFCON) in Jerusalem, which states "GAFCON produced a now widely published statement which does not address the innovations that led to the formation of our own Continuing Church in 1976-8: namely the "ordination of women," a new and radical Prayer Book, and a pro-abortion policy." The response concludes:We call upon all self-described Anglicans to reject clearly and decisively all of the liturgical, moral, and theological errors of recent years, beginning with the ordination of women.  We call upon all self-described Anglicans to return to the central Tradition of Christendom and to recognize that evangelical and neo-Pentecostalist Protestantism is no safe haven.  We welcome GAFCON as a small step in the right direction.  But we confidently predict that the ambiguities and silences that characterize its statement will lead rapidly to fragmentation and confusion without any countervailing theological achievement.  The only issue addressed in a somewhat adequate fashion by GAFCON is homosexuality. Far more is at stake.In 2009, Archbishop Mark Haverland published a letter to Bishop Robert Duncan, concerning the invitation to participate in the inaugural provincial assembly of the Anglican Church in North America on June 22–25, 2009. The letter indicates that the differences between the ACC and ACNA are "first principles" which do not allow unity, but offers a dialogue in the future if those "first principles" are resolved.

In December 2012, Archbishop Mark Haverland, together with the Rt. Rev. Paul Hewett (Diocese of the Holy Cross), the Most Rev. Walter Grundorf (Anglican Province of America), the Most Rev. Brian Marsh (Anglican Church in America), and the Most Rev. Peter D. Robinson (United Episcopal Church of North America) published a joint open letter to ACNA titled "An Appeal from the Continuing Anglican Churches to the ACNA and Associated Churches" which called for ACNA to re-examine the post-1976 innovations they have accepted:We call upon ACNA to heed our call to return to your classical Anglican roots.We commend to your prayerful attention the Affirmation of Saint Louis, which we firmly believe provides a sound basis for a renewed and fulfilled Anglicanism on our continent. We urge you to heed the call of Metropolitan Jonah, whose concerns we share. Anglicanism in North America cannot be both united and orthodox on a partially revolutionized basis. We call upon you to repudiate firmly any claim to alter doctrine or order against the consensus of the Catholic and Orthodox world. We call upon you to embrace the classical Prayer Book tradition.

Personal Ordinariate of the Chair of Saint Peter 
In 2009, Archbishop Mark Haverland published a response to Rome's announcement of the erection of the Personal Ordinariate of the Chair of Saint Peter. The response states that it "does not mark in any respect an ecumenical advance" and that as it provides only for "relatively one-sided conversions of former Anglicans with minimal concessions, we fear that the Note and Constitution in fact will harm and retard genuine ecumenical progress" and concludes: We hope eventually for a genuine dialogue concerning the Petrine Office and long for the day when we, with our Orthodox and Oriental Christian friends, may again find in the successor of Saint Peter a patriarch with the primacy of honor and with high authority both as an organ for strengthening the Church’s unity and also as an instrument for the articulation of the Church's teaching. We regret that the forthcoming Constitution, while kindly meant, seems set to delay that happy day.Other clergy of the ACC also wrote critically of Anglicanorum Coetibus.

Anglican Joint Synod 
The Anglican Catholic Church invited representatives from the Anglican Province of America, the Anglican Church in America, the Diocese of the Holy Cross and the Reformed Episcopal Church to its 2015 Provincial Synod. In January 2016, the Anglican Catholic Church reached a formal accord with the Anglican Church in America, the Anglican Province of America, and the Diocese of the Holy Cross. Forming the Anglican Joint Synods, a "Group of 4" churches, called the G-4, pursuing eventual corporate unity.

On October 6, 2017, at a joint synod in Atlanta, Georgia, the primates of the Anglican Province of America, the Anglican Church in America, the Anglican Catholic Church, and the Diocese of the Holy Cross signed a concordat of full communion. The Most Rev. Brian R. Marsh (ACA), the Most Rev. Mark Haverland (ACC), the Most Rev. Walter H. Grundorf (APA), and the Rt. Rev. Paul C. Hewett (DHC) signed the following document, called the Atlanta Concordat, which reads in part: We acknowledge each other to be orthodox and catholic Anglicans in virtue of our common adherence to the authorities accepted by and summarized in the Affirmation of St. Louis in the faith of the Holy Tradition of the undivided Catholic Church and of the seven Ecumenical Councils. We recognize in each other in all essentials the same faith; the same sacraments; the same moral teaching; and the same worship; likewise, we recognize in each other the same Holy Orders of bishops, priests, and deacons in the same Apostolic Succession, insofar as we all share the episcopate conveyed to the Continuing Churches in Denver in January 1978 in response to the call of the Congress of Saint Louis; therefore, We welcome members of all of our Churches to Holy Communion and parochial life in any and all of the congregations of our Churches; and, We pledge to pursue full, institutional, and organic union with each other, in a manner that respects tender consciences, builds consensus and harmony, and fulfills increasingly our Lord’s will that His Church be united; and, We pledge also to seek unity with other Christians, including those who understand themselves to be Anglican, insofar as such unity is consistent with the essentials of Catholic faith, order, and moral teaching.

Kevin Kallsen of Anglican TV Ministries interviewed the G-4 bishops, the Most Rev. Brian R. Marsh (ACA), the Most Rev. Mark Haverland (ACC), the Most Rev. Walter H. Grundorf (APA), and the Rt. Rev. Paul C. Hewett (DHC), on October 9, 2017, concerning the recently signed concordat.

In 2019, a joint mission and evangelism ministry called Continuing Forward was formed for these G-4 jurisdictions.

On September 23, 2021, the Diocese of the Holy Cross voted to join the Anglican Catholic Church as a non-geographical diocese. Making the "Group of 4" a "Group of 3" (G-3) churches.

Dialogue with the Polish National Catholic Church 
A dialogue between the G-4 churches and the Polish National Catholic Church (PNCC) opened, with the desire to reestablish the ties that had previously existed between the PNCC and the Anglican church. The meetings began after representatives of the PNCC were invited and attended the Anglican Joint Synods of the G-4 in 2017. The first official dialogue was held January 15, 2019, in Dunwoody, Georgia. The Jurisdictions of the G-4 were represented by their presiding bishops and archbishops from the Anglican Catholic Church, the Anglican Church in America, the Anglican Province of America, and the Diocese of the Holy Cross. Also in attendance was a bishop of the Anglican Catholic Church of Canada (ACCC). The PNCC was represented by three bishops, including Prime Bishop Anthony Mikovsky and Bishop Paul Sobiechowski, and two senior priests.

On July 28, 2020, the G-4/PNCC Ecumenical Dialogue Group met via Zoom.

On October 5–6, 2021, the G-3/PNCC Ecumenical Dialogue Group met at Holy Trinity Cathedral in Manchester, New Hampshire.

On March 15–16, 2022, the G-3/PNCC Ecumenical Dialogue Group met at the Anglican Cathedral of the Epiphany in Columbia, South Carolina.

As a part of the ACC worldwide joining the Union of Scranton, dialogue meetings between the Nordic Catholic Church and the ACC Diocese of the United Kingdom were held in March and September of 2019 and again in February 2020.

Church governance 
The Anglican Catholic Church holds to the Affirmation of St. Louis as a guiding document of faith and ecclesiology. It is further organized and governed according to the principles and terms laid out in its constitution and canons. In the Constitution, the church receives its name and it ecclesiastical structure. The method for establishing dioceses and provinces is established, and various processes related to the election of bishops and calling synods are laid out. The canons are an expansion of the principles laid out in the Constitution and provide a detailed legal framework for the governance of the church. The Original Province is further governed by its own canons and statutes. Each diocese is also governed by its own diocesan canons.

The polity of the ACC is episcopal and synodal. Regular synods are scheduled in the canons, with voting in joint sessions as well as separate sessions of the House of Clergy and House of Laity. The administration of each province and diocese includes appointed and elected officers, such as chancellor, treasurer, secretary, and judges of canonical courts, most of whom may be laity.

The Colleges of Bishops, under the presidency of the metropolitan, are in charge of the government and administration of the provinces of the Anglican Catholic Church. They are also responsible for the promulgation of official teaching and the instruction of the faithful. The colleges are composed of all bishops of the Provinces, active and retired, as well as any suffragans or coadjutors. The College of Bishops is responsible for overseeing administrative departments, each headed by a bishop and charged with a specific mission within the church. There are currently seven such departments in the Original Province.

 The Department of Ecumenical Relations (The Most Reverend Mark Haverland)
 The Department of Ministry (The Right Reverend Damien Mead)
 The Department of Theological Education (The Right Reverend Presley Hutchens)
 The Department of the Armed Forces (The Right Reverend Donald Lerow)
 The Department of Evangelism (The Right Stephen Scarlett)
 The Department of Stewardship (currently vacant)
 The Department of Multi-Lingual Resources (The Right Reverend Rommie Starks)

Sacraments and worship 

The ACC holds to seven sacraments, "The Sacraments of Baptism, Confirmation, the Holy Eucharist, Holy Matrimony, Holy Orders, Penance, and Unction of the Sick, [are] objective and effective signs of the continued presence and saving activity of Christ our Lord among His people and as His covenanted means for conveying His grace." Following the principles outlined in the Affirmation of St. Louis, the ACC holds to a high eucharistic theology, allowing reservation, adoration, Benediction, and Corpus Christi processions as "logical and godly extension of the facts of the objective and salvific Real Presence of Jesus Christ, God the Son, in and through his sacramental Body and Blood."

The celebration of the Eucharistic service is directed to be the norm for Sunday worship. The Constitution of the ACC further instructs that liturgical services may be celebrated from:The Book of Common Prayer in its 1549 English, 1928 American, 1954 South African, and 1962 Canadian editions, and the 1963 edition of the Church of India, Pakistan, Burma, and Ceylon as well as The Supplement To The Book of Common Prayer (C.I.P.B.C.) of 1960 shall be the Standard of Public Worship of this Church, together with The Anglican Missal, The American Missal, The English Missal, and other missals and devotional manuals, based on and conforming to those editions of The Book of Common Prayer. The Book of Common Praise of 1938 (Canada), The Hymnal, 1940, and The English Hymnal (New Edition, 1933) should be the primary musical standard for Public Worship.In 1994, a proposed amendment to permit the use of the 1662 Book of Common Prayer failed to pass all three houses at the Provincial Synod, on the grounds that the Black Rubric allowed a receptionist view of the Eucharist. Following the rubrics common to liturgical practice before the 1979 Book of Common Prayer, as well as the rubrics of the allowed Missals, liturgical celebration in the ACC follows a usus antiquior form of worship, including the ad orientem posture of the celebrant and the frequent use of communion rails. Following Anglican custom, communion is usually given to the laity under both kinds. The Ornaments Rubric is retained and permitted.

The ACC publishes an annual Ordo Calendar, which provides a standard for feasts, fasts, and general rubrics for liturgical services. The Ordo Calendar generally follows pre-1969 traditions with Anglican adaptations and makes provision for local Anglican feasts.

Doctrine 
In addition to the dogmatic theology expressed in the Affirmation of St. Louis, the ACC expressly follows classical Anglo-Catholic theology. The Apostles' Creed, the Nicene Creed (with the restoration of the word "Holy") and the Athanasian Creed are accepted as binding expressions of Christian dogma. The filioque is recognized as a later addition, open to non-orthodox interpretation, and an obstacle between the ACC and the Eastern Orthodox. The Virgin Birth and the title of Theotokos as expressed at the Council of Ephesus are considered biblically-founded dogmas. Other Marian beliefs, such as Perpetual Virginity, the New Eve, the Assumption, and the Immaculate Conception are considered to be widely held theological views consistent with the faith and are liturgically celebrated. The term "mediatrix of all graces" is rejected as novel and open to misinterpretation, though the intercession of Mary and the practice of Marian devotions is affirmed. The prayers of the saints in heaven to assist the faithful on earth is affirmed, as well as the practice of requesting those prayers from the saints. Purgatory as a particular state or place is considered speculative, though prayers for the dead are allowed as efficacious. The Eucharist is understood as a sacrifice, re-presenting Christ's death, in which Christ is truly present and gives grace. Good deeds are not considered to earn salvation, but are instead "a natural response to God's free and unelicited gift of grace to man in Christ." God gives grace freely, with which God's people are called to cooperate by a godly, righteous, and sober life. The XXXIX Articles are not considered to have normative, independent authority on matters of doctrine or practice.

Morals & Ethics 
The Anglican Catholic Church believes in the sanctity of human life. The Archbishop of the ACC, Mark Haverland, authored academic articles on bioethics, particularly end-of-life issues. He signed the Statement Opposing Brain Death Criteria released by Citizens United Resisting Euthanasia. At the 2019 Anglican Joint Synods, the ACC along with the other G-4 churches, released a joint proclamation on abortion in response to the Reproductive Health Act that had been passed by the New York State legislature earlier that year. The proclamation affirms a right to life as given by natural law, and calls for evangelistic action to curtail abortion laws through prayer and support for crisis pregnancy centers. 

The ACC holds that sexual acts are only licet and moral within monogamous heterosexual marriage. A homosexual orientation is defined as objectively disordered but not subjectively sinful. Marriage, as one of the seven sacraments, is held to be an indissoluable union between a man and a woman for the purposes of mutual comfort and the procreation of children.

Original Province
Source:

Dioceses in the Americas 
Diocese of the Holy Cross
Diocese of the Mid-Atlantic States
Diocese of the Midwest
Diocese of New Orleans
Diocese of the Holy Trinity
Diocese of the Resurrection
Diocese of the South
Diocese of the New Grenada (Colombia, Venezuela, Chile and Brazil)
Missionary Diocese of the Caribbean
Missionary Diocese of Canada

Dioceses in Europe 
Diocese of the United Kingdom
Deanery of Europe

Dioceses in Oceania 
Missionary Diocese of Australia and New Zealand
Missionary Diocese of the Philippines

Dioceses in Africa 
Diocese of Kenya
Diocese of Cameroon
Diocese of Congo (South Kivu (exclusive Fizi, Uvira and Mwenga), North Kivu, Central, West, North and South)
Missionary Diocese of Eastern Congo (Fizi, Uvira and Mwenga)
Missionary Diocese of Rwanda
Diocese of the Aweil (Sudan)
Missionary Diocese of the West (South Africa)
Diocese of Christ the Redeemer (South Africa)

Second Province
In 1984 the five dioceses of the Church of India (CIPBC) were received by the Anglican Catholic Church and constituted as its second province, but they rescinded Communion between 2013 and 2017 over matters relating to the status of the second province and became independent. In 2018, Archbishop Mark Haverland and Most Rev. John Augustine, Metropolitan of the CIPBC, signed an agreement restoring communio in sacris. The Second Province of the ACC now consists of one diocese:
Diocese of Lahore

Third Province 
The Missionary Diocese of Southern Africa (ACC) was established in 2005. In September 2021, by a vote of the Provincial Synod of the Original Province, a third Province, the Province of Southern Africa, was established. The Right Reverend Dominic Mdunyelwa was elected as its first Archbishop and Metropolitan and was installed by Archbishop Mark Haverland on November 14, 2021. Additionally, the Diocese of Umzi Wase Tiyopiya and Rt. Rev. Siviwe Samuel Maqoma were accepted into the newly created province and renamed the Diocese of Christ the King. The newly autonomous Province was composed of 5 dioceses in South Africa, and the one and only diocese in Zimbabwe. The 2 remaining dioceses in South Africa voted to remain part of the Original Province. In 2023, the Province raised the Patrimony of Johannesburg to a diocese, bringing the number of dioceses to 7. The Province consists of the following dioceses:

 Diocese of Kei
 Missionary Diocese of Ekurhuleni
 Missionary Diocese of Saint Paul
 Missionary Diocese of Vaal
 Missionary Diocese of Johannesburg
 Diocese of Christ the King
 Diocese of Zimbabwe

Leadership
The Anglican Catholic Church claims Apostolic succession, originating from The Episcopal Church from before the date of ordination of women to the priesthood. It is also stated that there are Old Catholic and Polish National Catholic Church consecrations in the line of succession. The first bishops of the Anglican Church of North America, later named the Anglican Catholic Church, were consecrated on January 28, 1978, in Denver, Colorado. In Denver, Charles Dale David Doren, sometime Archdeacon of the Diocese of Taejon in South Korea, was consecrated by the Rt Rev’d Albert Arthur Chambers, sometime Pecusa Bishop of Springfield (PECUSA #588) and Acting Metropolitan of the ACNA. Joining Bishop Chambers in the consecration of Doren was the Rt Rev’d Francisco de Jesus Pagtakhan of the Philippine Independent Catholic Church. Letters of Consent and Desire for the Doren consecration were in hand from the Rt Rev’d Mark Pae (Taejon, Korea) and Rt Rev'd Charles Boynton.

Episcopal succession in the ACC 
The name or number in bold is the chief consecrator, who either would be the Metropolitan or Acting Metropolitan or would be a bishop acting with the warrant of the Metropolitan or Acting Metropolitan. An asterisk indicates a bishop who has left the communion of the ACC.

Metropolitan archbishops (Original Province) 

 Charles David Dale Doren (Senior Bishop) 1978-1981
 James Orin Mote (Senior Bishop) 1981 - 1983
 Louis W. Falk 1983 – 1991
 William O. Lewis 1991 – 1997
Michael Dean Stephens 1997 – 1998
 John T Cahoon, Jnr. 1999 – 2001
 John Vockler 2001 – 2005
 Mark Haverland 2005–present

Active episcopate 
Metropolitan of the Original Province and Acting Primate: Mark Haverland, Athens, Georgia
Bishop Ordinary, Diocese of Lahore, Punjab, Pakistan: Mushtaq Andrew
Metropolitan of the Third Province, The Province of Southern Africa:  Dominic Mdunyelwa
Bishop Ordinary, Diocese of the Holy Cross: Paul C. Hewett, Columbia, South Carolina
Bishop Ordinary, Diocese of the Mid-Atlantic States: Donald Lerow, Jacksonville, North Carolina
Bishop Ordinary, Diocese of the Midwest: Rommie Starks, Indianapolis, Indiana
Bishop Ordinary, Diocese of New Orleans & Episcopal Visitor, Missionary Diocese of the Philippines: Terry Lowe, Natchitoches, Louisiana
Bishop Ordinary, Diocese of New England: Rocco Florenza, Ansonia, Connecticut
Bishop Ordinary, Diocese of the United Kingdom: Damien Mead, Lydd, Romney Marsh, Kent
Bishop Ordinary, Diocese of Australia & New Zealand: Ian Woodman, Parau, New Zealand
Bishop Ordinary, Diocese of Aweil (Sudan): Wilson Gerang
Bishop Ordinary, Diocese of the South: Mark Haverland, Athens, Georgia
Bishop Ordinary, Diocese of the Holy Trinity: Stephen Scarlett, Newport Beach, CA
Bishop Ordinary, Diocese of Christ the Redeemer (South Africa): Solomzi Mentjies
Bishop Ordinary, Diocese of the Kei (South Africa):  Dominic Mdunyelwa
Bishop Ordinary, Missionary Diocese of Ekurhuleni (South Africa):  Elliot Mnyande
Bishop Ordinary, Missionary Diocese of the Vaal (South Africa): Jacob Qhesi
Bishop Ordinary, Diocese of Christ the King (South Africa): Siviwe Samuel Maqoma 
Bishop Ordinary, Diocese of Zimbabwe: Elfigio Mandizvidza, Harare, Zimbabwe
Bishop Ordinary, Missionary Diocese of Kenya: John Ndegwa, Kayole, Nairobi, Kenya
Bishop Ordinary, Diocese of Cameroon: Alphonse Ndutiye
Bishop Ordinary, Diocese of the Congo: Steven Ayule-Milenge, Bukavu, DRC
Bishop Ordinary, Missionary Diocese of Eastern Congo: Lamek Mtundu
Bishop Ordinary, Diocese of the New Granada: Germán Orrego Hurtado, Pereira, Colombia
The following dioceses are under the Patrimony of the Metropolitan, Mark Haverland
Vicar General, Missionary Diocese of the West (South Africa):  Damien Truslow-Trudeau, Stilfontein, NW
Vicar General, Missionary Diocese of the Caribbean (Haiti):  Jean-Bien Aimé
Vicar General, Missionary Diocese of Rwanda: Chadrack Niyibizi
Deanery of Europe

Retired 

 The Right Reverend Presley Hutchens (Diocese of New Orleans 2005 – 2012)
 The Right Reverend Denis Hodge (Diocese of Australia and New Zealand)
 The Right Reverend Stanley Lazarczyk (Diocese of the South)
 The Right Reverend William McClean (Diocese of the Mid-Atlantic States)

Deceased 

 The Most Reverend William O. Lewis (? – September 23, 1997), bishop of the Diocese of the Midwest (1979–1987), bishop of the Diocese of the South (1987–1997), and archbishop (1991–1997)
The Most Reverend Michael Dean Stephens (1940 – March 29, 1998), bishop of the Diocese of New Orleans (1986–1998) and archbishop (1997–1998)
The Right Reverend William Rutherford (1919–2001), retired bishop of the Diocese of the Mid-Atlantic States (1981–1995)
The Most Reverend John T. Cahoon, Jnr. (January 3, 1948 – October 4, 2001), bishop of the Diocese of the Mid-Atlantic States (1995–2001) and archbishop (1999–2001)
The Right Reverend James Orin Mote (January 27, 1922 – April 28, 2006), retired bishop of the Diocese of the Holy Trinity (1978–1994)
The Right Reverend John Vockler, FODC (July 22, 1924 – February 6, 2014), retired bishop of the Diocese of New Orleans (1999–2005) and retired archbishop (2001–2005)
The Right Reverend John-Benedict (McDonald), CGS (December 20, 1956 – December 8, 2018), bishop of the Missionary Diocese of the Philippines (October 20, 2016 – December 8, 2018)
 The Right Reverend Edward Ethan LaCour (November 4, 1928 – February 1, 2020), retired Vicar General in the Diocese of the South
 The Right Reverend Alan Kenyon-Hoare (December 21, 1936 – January 20, 2021), retired bishop of the ACC Missionary Diocese of South Africa (November 7, 2010 – March 1, 2015)

Publications 

The official publishing house of the ACC is the Anglican Parishes Association, an organization founded in 1981 by the then Right Reverend William O. Lewis. It operates from Athens, Georgia. In 2020, the Anglican Parishes Association republished a new edition of the Anglican Missal, containing the Ordinary and Canon from the English (1549), American (1928), South African (1954), Canadian (1962), and Indian (1963) Prayer Books, along with a parallel text of the Gregorian Mass in Latin and in English.

Official gazettes 
The Trinitarian is the Official Gazette of the Anglican Catholic Church. It was founded in 1979 as the diocesan newsletter of the Diocese of the Holy Trinity, and in 1982 became the principal news outlet of the ACC. Since 2018 it has also carried official news of the other G-4 churches.

Diocesan newsletters 

 Fortnightly (Diocese of the Holy Cross)
ACC-UK (Diocese of the United Kingdom)
 The Credo (Diocese of the Mid-Atlantic States)
The Southern Cross (Diocese of the South)

References

Further reading 

 Haverland, Mark (2011). Anglican Catholic Faith and Practice. ISBN 978-0977714803.
 Hewett, Paul C. (2020). The Day-spring from on High. ISBN 978-1647535513.
 Bess, Douglas (2002). Divided We Stand: A History of the Continuing Anglican Movement. ISBN 978-0971963603.
 Munn, Jonathan (2019). Anglican Catholicism: Unchanging Faith in a Changing World. ISBN 978-0244462123.
 Andrews, Robert M. (2022). Continuing Anglicanism? The History, Theology, and Contexts of “The Affirmation of St Louis” (1977). Journal of Religious History, 46(1), 40–60. https://doi.org/10.1111/1467-9809.12821

External links
 
 Diocese of the Holy Cross
 YouTube channel
 Vimeo channel



Christian organizations established in 1977
Continuing Anglican denominations
Anglican denominations in North America
1977 establishments in Missouri
Anglo-Catholicism